Christian Spielmann (born 1963, Innsbruck, Austria) is an Austrian  physicist and a professor at the University of Jena

Education and career
Spielmann obtained his Ph.D. in 1989 at the Vienna University of Technology where he also habilitated in 1999. In 2002 he became professor of experimental physics at the University of Würzburg, before moving to Jena in 2008. In 1998, Spielman received the Fritz-Kohlrausch-Physik Award (for achievements in experimental physics by junior scientists) from the Austrian Physical Society and in 2011 the Thuringian Research Award for his work in X-ray spectroscopy.

References

External links

Google scholar profile

Austrian physicists
1963 births
Living people
Academic staff of the University of Jena
TU Wien alumni
Scientists from Innsbruck